Anarchists of Andalusia, 1868–1903 is a 1977 history book about Spanish anarchists by Temma Kaplan.

Bibliography

External links 

 

1977 non-fiction books
English-language books
History books about anarchism
History of Andalusia
Anarchism in Spain
Princeton University Press books